O. gracilis may refer to:
 Obruchevichthys gracilis, an extinct tetrapod species from Latvia during the Late Devonian
 Oceanites gracilis, the Elliot's storm-petrel, a seabird species
 Oedipina gracilis, a salamander species found in Costa Rica and Panama
 Omphalotropis gracilis, a gastropod species endemic to Guam
 Ormosia gracilis, a legume species found only in Malaysia
 Oxidus gracilis, the "greenhouse millipede", a widely introduced millipede associated with agricultural areas worldwide
 Oxyopsis gracilis, the South American green mantis, a praying mantis species

See also
 Gracilis (disambiguation)